Odonis Odonis are a Canadian industrial and electronic music group from Toronto, Ontario. They are known for their 2014 album Hard Boiled Soft Boiled, which was a longlisted nominee for the 2014 Polaris Music Prize.

History
Odonis Odonis was formed by Dean Tzenos after he left Ten Kens, and also included Jarod Gibson and Denholm Whale. In 2009 the trio recorded a group of tracks that would become their album Hard Boiled Soft Boiled, but then released a different set of material as their debut album Hollandaze in 2011. That album appeared on the !earshot Campus and Community National Top 50 Albums chart in January 2012.

Hard Boiled Soft Boiled, was eventually released in 2014. The album was marked by a dichotomy between the first half of the album, which comprised aggressive and hard-edged industrial music, and the second half, which softened into shoegaze-influenced electronic dream pop. In addition to the album's Polaris nomination, the band received a Prism Prize nomination in 2015 for their video "Order in the Court", directed by Lee Stringle.

In 2016 the band followed up with their third album, Post Plague. The compact disc version was released by felte, the vinyl version by felte and Telephone Explosion Records and the compact cassette tape version by Geertruida.

In 2017 the band released their fourth album, No Pop. The record received an 8.1 rating from Pitchfork

Their fifth album, Spectrums, was released on October 15, 2021. The album was nominated for the 2023 Juno for Electronic Album of The Year.

Discography

Studio albums
2011 – Hollandaze (FatCat Records)
2014 – Hard Boiled Soft Boiled (Buzz Records)
2016 – Post Plague (Felte Records/Geertruida/Telephone Explosion Records)
2017 – No Pop (Felte Records)
2019 – Reaction (EP) (Felte Records)
2021 – Spectrums (Felte Records)

References

External links

Canadian industrial music groups
Canadian electronic music groups
Musical groups from Toronto
Musical groups established in 2009
Geertruida (record label) artists
FatCat Records artists
2009 establishments in Ontario